The Lutheran Minnesota Conference was one of the 13 conferences of the Augustana Evangelical Lutheran Synod. Formed by Swedish immigrants in the 1800s, it originally encompassed Minnesota, parts of North Dakota, South Dakota, Canada, and Wisconsin. Its size was substantially reduced years later when Alexandria, Fargo, and Red River Districts became the Red River Valley Conference in 1912, and the Alberta District and Canada Mission field became the Canada Conference in 1913. With the creation of the Lutheran Church in America (LCA) in 1962, it became known as the Minnesota Synod.

Organizers of the Minnesota Conference were Rev. Peter Carlson, Rev. Eric Norelius, Rev. Peter Beckman, Rev. Johan Peter Carlson Boren and laymen Daniel Nelson, Hakan Svedberg, Frans C. Bjorklund, and Ole Paulson were present at the first meeting of the Minnesota Conference held October 7–9, 1858 at Chisago Lake. At the end of 1961, the Minnesota Conference had the most baptized members of any conference in the Augustana Synod with 182,374 baptized members and 300 congregations.

In 1862 members of the Minnesota Conference founded Minnesota Elementary School in Red Wing, which was renamed St. Ansgar’s Academy and moved to East Union in 1865.  The institution relocated to Saint Peter in 1876 and was officially recognized as Gustavus Adolphus College. Other educational institutions erected by the Minnesota Conference include Minnesota College, founded in 1904, Lutheran Bible Institute, founded in 1919, and North Star College and Northwestern College, which both became part of the Red River Conference.

Districts
Apple River District, Big Stone District, Chisago District, Cokato District, Goodhue District, Iron Range District, Lake Superior District, Mille Lacs District, Minneapolis District, Montevideo District, St. Croix District, St. James District, St. Paul District, St. Peter District, Sioux Falls District, Willmar District

Presidents
1858 - Johan Peter Carlson Boren
1859 - Peter Anderson Cederstam, Peter Carlson, Johan Peter Carlson Boren
1860 - Peter Anderson Cederstam, Eric Norelius
1861 - Johan Peter Carlson Boren, L. H. Noren, Eric Norelius
1862 - Peter Anderson Cederstam, Andrew Jackson
1863 - Carl August Hedengran, Johan Peter Carlson Boren, Peter Carlson
1864 - Eric Norelius, John Pehrson, Andrew Jackson
1865 - N. Olson, Eric Norelius, Peter Carlson
1866 - Andrew Jackson, Carl August Hedengran, John Pehrson
1867 - Eric Norelius, Peter Carlson, Peter Anderson Cederstam
1868 - John Pehrson, Andrew Jackson, Peter Carlson
1869 - Andrew Jackson, Ole Paulson, Peter Carlson
1870 - Peter Sjöblom, Eric Norelius
1871-73 - Eric Norelius
1874 - Peter Sjöblom 
1875 - Jonas Auslund
1876 - Peter Sjöblom
1877 - Jonas Ausland, Peter Anderson Cederstam
1878 - Peter Sjöblom
1879 - Eric Norelius 
1880 - Andrew Jackson	
1881-82 - Peter Sjöblom
1883-86 - Johannes Fremling
1887 - Per Johan Swärd 
1888-92 - Peter Sjöblom
1893-96 - Eric Norelius 
1897-99 - Johannes Fremling
1900 - Peter Sjöblom
1901-04 - Johannes Fremling
1905-12 - Johan Ander Krantz
1913-38 - Peter A. Mattson 
1939 - Peter A. Mattson, Emil Swenson
1940-54 - Emil Swenson 
1955 - Emil Swenson, Leonard A. Kendall
1956-62 - Leonard A. Kendall

External links 
 Microfilm Index at the Lutheran Church Archives at Gustavus Adolphus College
 Minnesota Conference church and congregational histories, including baptisms, confirmations, marriages, deaths, and meeting minutes.
 Minnesota Conference Collections by District at the Lutheran Church Archives at Gustavus Adolphus College
 Collection finding aid descriptions and district maps

References

Swedish migration to North America
Evangelical Lutheran Church in America predecessor churches
Lutheranism in the United States